Dipa Nusantara Aidit (born Ahmad Aidit; 30 July 1923 – 22 November 1965) was an Indonesian communist politician, who served as General Secretary of the Communist Party of Indonesia (PKI) from 1951 until his summary execution during the mass killings of 1965–66. Born on Belitung Island, he was nicknamed "Amat". Aidit was educated in the Dutch colonial system.

Biography
Aidit was born Achmad Aidit in Tanjung Pandan, Belitung, 30 July 1923. He was the first son of four. His parents were Abdullah Aidit and Mailan. Achmad and his siblings studied at Hollandsche Inlandsch School.

In early 1936, Achmad asked his father to continue his studies in Jakarta (then called Batavia). Achmad then attended Middestand Handel School, instead of Meer Uitgebreid Lager Onderwijs, because the registration had already been closed. For three years he lived in Cempaka Putih with his father's colleague. He moved to Senen and lived with his brother Murad who followed in Achmad's footsteps. Unwilling to rely on money sent by their parents, Achmad and Murad tried to earn money themselves. In those times, Achmad was an active as member of Persatuan Timur Muda, under Gerindo (Indonesian People's Movement), led by Amir Sjarifudin and Adnan Kapau Gani, and later became the chairman. Achmad also changed his name to Dipa Nusantara, which was shortened as D.N. and was often mistaken for Djafar Nawawi, to conceal his descent which was at first, rejected by his father.

During the Japanese occupation, in Asrama Menteng 31 D.N. Aidit and his friends received political lectures from Sukarno, Hatta, Amir Sjarifudin, Achmad Subardjo, and Ki Hajar Dewantoro. There, in 1943, Aidit first met M.H. Lukman. They were members of Gerakan Indonesia Merdeka while Aidit as the chairman of political council of the organization and Lukman as his member. In 1944, they were elected as the member of Barisan Pelopor Indonesia, the 100 men who were most loyal to Sukarno. About one year before Indonesian independence, Aidit, M.H. Lukman, Sidik Kertapati, Chalid Rasjidi, and the other young men studied politics at Asrama Kemerdekaan founded by Rear Admiral Maeda and headed by Wikana.

In early September 1945, Angkatan Pemuda Indonesia was formed. Aidit was appointed as the chairman of API section Jakarta Raya. On 5 November, Aidit, Alizar Thaib, and the other API member attacked Koninklijk Nederlands Indisch Leger's post but eventually were arrested. They were then exiled to Onrust island. After seven months, Aidit and Lukman were released. One day after released, they went to Yogyakarta to meet Wikana. In Yogyakarta, Aidit and Lukman ran the bimonthly magazine, . There, they met Njoto, PKI's Banyuwangi representative.

In March 1947, Aidit was appointed as chairman of a PKI faction in a KNIP meeting. In early 1948, Aidit, Lukman, and Njoto were assigned to translate The Communist Manifesto into Indonesian. In August, the three became members of the Central Committee, respectively responsible for land affair, agitation and propaganda, and relation to other organizations. The three and Sudisman became members of the new PKI Politburo formed by Musso on 1 September 1948. Aidit was responsible for the labor section of the party. Aidit and Lukman managed to escape to China and Vietnam after PKI position was pressed in Madiun Affair, while Murad claimed that Aidit took shelter in Tanjung Priok. While in hiding, Aidit and Lukman reran  on 15 August 1950. They also published  two weekly. In January 1951, Njoto joined the latter.

After the 1948 affair, the four young members of the Politburo, Aidit, Njoto, Lukman, and Sudisman replaced the old leaders in January 1951 as a result of the fifth congress of the party. Aidit was appointed as the secretary general of the party, which was later renamed as chairman, while Njoto and Lukman as his deputies. PKI led by Aidit was not only based on labor and plantation worker, but also farmer.

Though a Marxist, Aidit submitted to Sukarno's Marhaenism policy and allowed the party to grow without any overt intentions towards power. In return for his support of Sukarno, he rose to the position of Secretary-General of the PKI. Under his administration, the party became the 3rd largest Communist party in the world, behind those of the Soviet Union and China. He set up a number of programs including the Pemuda Rakyat for the youth, and Gerwani, a women's league.

During the 1955 general election campaign, Aidit and the PKI drew a large following. In the next decade, the PKI became a leftist rival to conservative elements among the Muslim political parties and the Army. By 1965, the PKI had become the largest political party in Indonesia, and Aidit became bolder in overtures towards power.

Sjam claimed that on 12 August 1965 he met Aidit and was instructed to assess the party's power that time.

An attempted coup occurred on 30 September 1965, which was later officially blamed on the PKI (see Transition to the New Order). On 2 October, Aidit went to Yogyakarta to meet the regional PKI chairman Sutrisno. After a few hours, Aidit moved to Semarang also to consolidate to the party officials in the region. The meeting concluded that the coup was the Army's internal problem and PKI knew nothing about it. In the afternoon of that day, Aidit went to Boyolali to meet Boyolali regent Suwali who was a PKI member. Aidit then went to Solo to meet the mayor Utomo Ramelan who was also a member. The meeting contradicted the conclusion of the meeting in Semarang. Several Politbiro members including Aidit and M.H. Lukman met in Blitar on 5 October. There Aidit wrote a letter of the PKI view of the coup which was read by Njoto during a cabinet meeting in Bogor.

Aidit then fled to Boyolali, where he was captured by forces loyal to General Suharto. According to Zulkifli & Hidayat, on 22 November Aidit was arrested by a search party led by Colonel Yasir Hadibroto in a house in Sambeng Village, Solo. In the early morning, he was brought to Boyolali and was summarily executed as part of the bloody 1965/66 anti-communist purge.

Political views
According to Ricklefs, Aidit thought that "Marxism was a guide to action, not an inflexible dogma". Aidit sympathized with Musso's Jalan Baru untuk Republik Indonesia (A New Road for Indonesian Republic), though he stated that the Madiun Affair was just "children's games".

Legacy 
Some of his writings were published as The Selected Works of D.N. Aidit (2 vols. Vol. I JPRS-6551; Vol. II JPRS-8886; Washington: US Joint Publications Research Service, 1961).

Personal life
Aidit married Soetanti in early 1948. Aidit's second son, Ilham, was born on 18 May 1959 in Moscow.

Footnotes

Bibliography

 Melvin, Jess (2018) The Army and the Indonesian Genocide: Mechanics of Mass Murder Routledge, UK 

 Robinson, Geoffrey B. (2018) The Killing Season: A History of the Indonesian Massacres, 1965-66 Princeton University Press 
 
 

1923 births
1965 deaths
Communist Party of Indonesia politicians
Executed communists
Executed politicians
Indonesian people of Malay descent
People executed by Indonesia by firearm
People from Belitung Regency
Executed Indonesian people
Members of the People's Representative Council, 1955
Indonesian newspaper editors